Nana Akwasi Asare (born 11 July 1986) is a Ghanaian professional footballer, who most recently played for Belgian club Gent as a left back. Between 2007 and 2012 he made five appearances for the Ghana national team.

Club career
Born in Kumasi, Asare has played for Feyenoord Fetteh, Feyenoord, Royal Antwerp, Mechelen, Utrecht and Gent.

Asare moved from Mechelen to Utrecht in May 2009. He signed a four-year contract with Gent in June 2013.

In September 2020, Asare's contract with Gent was terminated by mutual consent. Through seven seasons, including three seasons as team captain, he made 272 appearances for the club, including 215 in the Belgian First Division A, 24 in the Belgian Cup, 1 in the Belgian Super Cup and 32 in European competitions. When he left the club, he was also the player with the most European minutes ever for Gent, namely 2824 minutes.

International career
Asare earned 5 caps for Ghana between 2007 and 2012. He was a squad member at the 2008 Africa Cup of Nations.

Honours
Gent
Belgian Pro League: 2014–15
Belgian Super Cup: 2015

References

1986 births
Living people
Footballers from Kumasi
Ghanaian footballers
Ghana international footballers
West African Football Academy players
Feyenoord players
Royal Antwerp F.C. players
K.V. Mechelen players
FC Utrecht players
K.A.A. Gent players
Eredivisie players
Challenger Pro League players
Belgian Pro League players
Association football defenders
Ghanaian expatriate footballers
Ghanaian expatriate sportspeople in the Netherlands
Expatriate footballers in the Netherlands
Ghanaian expatriate sportspeople in Belgium
Expatriate footballers in Belgium
2008 Africa Cup of Nations players
Cornerstones F.C. players